Cheshmeh Vesg-e Deli Khomsir (also Romanized as Cheshmeh Vesg-e Delī Khomsīr) is a village in Kabgian Rural District, Kabgian District, Dana County, Kohgiluyeh and Boyer-Ahmad Province, Iran. At the 2006 census, its population was 50, in 15 families.

References 

Populated places in Dana County